Zuhair Hussain Ghunaim from Jeddah, Saudi Arabia served as the Secretary General of the International Union of Muslim Scouts.

In 2012, Ghunaim was awarded the 336th Bronze Wolf, the only distinction of the World Organization of the Scout Movement, awarded by the World Scout Committee for exceptional services to world Scouting.

Ghunaim studied at Institut Supérieur d'Informatique et de Multimédia de Sfax and lives in Jeddah, Saudi Arabia.

References

External links

Recipients of the Bronze Wolf Award
Year of birth missing
Scouting and Guiding in Saudi Arabia